Acantharctia atriramosa is a moth of the family Erebidae. It was described by George Hampson in 1907. It is found in Kenya, Uganda and Zambia.

References 

Moths described in 1907
Spilosomina
Moths of Africa